A pulse, in physiology, is the throbbing of arteries resulting from heartbeat.

Pulse, The Pulse or Pulses may also refer to:

Botany
 Pulse (legume), any agriculturally significant annual leguminous food crop, such as peas, beans, lentils, and chickpeas

Electronics and physics
 Pulse (physics), a single disturbance through a transmission medium
 Pulse (signal processing), a brief change from a baseline value
 Pulse dialing, of a telephone

Books and publications
 Pulse (magazine), a medical professional's magazine
 Pulse! (magazine), a music magazine
 Pulse (Augustus), a character in the Marvel Comics universe
 Pulse (short story collection), a short story collection by Julian Barnes
 Pulse, a book by Robert Frenay
 The Pulse, the signal transmitted from cell phones that made people go crazy in Stephen King's novel Cell
 The Pulse (comics), a Marvel Comics series

Film, television and games

Film
 Pulse (1988 film), a horror film starring Cliff De Young
 Pulse (1995 film), a video by the band Pink Floyd
 Pulse (2001 film) or Kairo, a Japanese horror film directed by Kiyoshi Kurosawa
 Octane (film), a 2002 thriller film released in the U.S. as Pulse
 Pulse: A Stomp Odyssey, a 2002 short documentary
 Pulse (2006 film), an American remake of the 2001 Japanese film
 Pulse, a 2010 British TV film directed by James Hawes
 Pulse Films, a film company headquartered in London

Radio
 Pulse 1, an independent FM radio station in West Yorkshire, England
 Pulse 2, an independent AM radio station in West Yorkshire, England
 Pulse! Radio, a student-run radio station at the London School of Economics, England
 KVIT is a Mesa, Arizona-based, student-run radio station operated by the East Valley Institute of Technology that is branded The Pulse
 WKJO (FM), a radio station (102.3 FM) licensed to Smithfield, North Carolina, which was called Pulse 102 from 2010 to 2014
 WKXU (FM), a radio station (102.5 FM) licensed to Hillsborough, North Carolina, which was called Pulse FM from 2010 to 2022
 WPLW-FM, a radio station (96.9 FM) licensed to Goldsboro, North Carolina, which is called Pulse FM
 WTPL, a radio station (107.7 FM) licensed to Hillsboro, New Hampshire, which is called The Pulse of NH
 WEMJ, a radio station (1490 AM) licensed to Laconia, New Hampshire, which simulcasts WTPL
 WTSN (AM), a radio station (1270 AM) licensed to Dover, New Hampshire, which simulcasts WTPL
 94.7 The Pulse, an Australian community radio station from Geelong, Victoria
 The Pulse (SiriusXM), a hot AC channel on Sirius XM Radio
 The Pulse (Sirius), the original Sirius incarnation on Channel 9 until November 12, 2008
 Sounds of the Seasons: The Pulse, a Music Choice ambient music channel
 The Pulse (radio), a college basketball program that aired on ESPN Radio
 The Pulse, a health and science radio show on WHYY-FM

Television
 Pulse (TV channel), a media stream based on video games and sports
 Pulse (American TV series), a videogame news program aired on G4TV
 Pulse (Australian TV series), a 2017 drama lasting eight episodes
 The Pulse (TV programme), RTHK English-language current affairs programme

Video games
 Pulse (video game), a 2011 music video game by Cipher Prime

Music
 Pulse (music), a rhythmic succession of sounds

Groups
 Pulse (American band), an American dance/house project
 Pulse (UK band), a UK group, winners of the reality TV show Dance X
 Twist and Pulse, an English street dance band

Albums
 Pulse (Front 242 album), 2003
 Pulse (Toni Braxton album), 2010
 Pulse (Thomas Giles album), 2011
 Pulse (Megumi Hayashibara album), 1994
 Pulse (Greg Phillinganes album), 1984
 Pulse (Pink Floyd album), 1995
 Pulses (Karmin album), 2014
 Pulses (The Fast Feeling album), 2017

Songs
 "Pulse" (song), by Fluke
 "Pulse", a song by Erra from Augment
 "Pulse", a song by Loop from Fade Out
 "Pulse", a song by The Mad Capsule Markets from Osc-Dis
 "Pulse", a song by Mushroomhead from A Wonderful Life
 "Pulse", a song by Orchestral Manoeuvres in the Dark from History of Modern
 "Pulse", a song by The Psychedelic Furs from The Psychedelic Furs

Technology
 Pulse (ALM), a proprietary application lifecycle management technology
 Pulse (app), an app for Android and the iPad, now owned by LinkedIn
 Pulse (interbank network), an electronic funds transfer network
 PULSE (P2PTV), a peer-to-peer software
 PULSE (Police Using Leading Systems Effectively), a computer system used by the Garda Síochána, the police force in the Republic of Ireland
 Pulse Smartpen, a ballpoint pen, computer, and audio recorder manufactured by Livescribe
 Novell Pulse, an enterprise collaboration software platform
 T-Mobile Pulse, an Android phone manufactured by Huawei

Transportation
 Fiat Pulse, a subcompact crossover SUV
 GRTC Pulse, a bus rapid transit line in Richmond, Virginia
 The Pulse, a three-wheeled electric vehicle prototype produced by Arcimoto
 Renault Pulse, an Indian version of the supermini car Nissan Micra
 UP Pulse, a German paraglider design

Other
 Pulse (confectionery), an Indian hard-boiled candy
 Pulse (festival), an annual cultural, literary, and sports festival of the All India Institute of Medical Sciences in New Delhi, India
 Providing Urban Learners Success in Education (PULSE) High School, New York City
 Pulse nightclub, an Orlando, Florida gay bar, dance club, and nightclub where a mass shooting occurred in June 2016
 The Pulse (shopping mall), a shopping arcade in Repulse Bay, Hong Kong
 PULSE, an interdisciplinary project at Boston College administered by the Lonergan Institute
 Central Pulse, a New Zealand netball team based in Wellington

See also

 Journal-News Pulse, a defunct weekly broadsheet newspaper founded in Mason, Ohio, US

 

 Puls (disambiguation)